Evgeny Ivannikov (born April 29, 1991 in St. Petersburg) is a Russian professional ice hockey goaltender. He is currently a free agent.

Playing career
Ivannikov made his Kontinental Hockey League debut playing with Admiral Vladivostok during the 2013–14 season. On May 9, 2018, four days after being previously re-acquired by SKA Saint Petersburg, Ivannikov was traded on to HC Yugra in exchange for Nikita Zorkin.

Following two seasons in the Supreme Hockey League (VHL) with HC Yugra, Ivannikov made a return to the KHL after agreeing to a one-year contract with Neftekhimik Nizhnekamsk on 14 July 2020.

References

External links

1991 births
Living people
Admiral Vladivostok players
HC Lada Togliatti players
MHk 32 Liptovský Mikuláš players
HC Neftekhimik Nizhnekamsk players
Russian ice hockey goaltenders
SKA Saint Petersburg players
HC Spartak Moscow players
Ice hockey people from Saint Petersburg
HC Yugra players
Russian expatriate sportspeople in Slovakia
Expatriate ice hockey players in Slovakia
Russian expatriate ice hockey people